Scott County (standard abbreviation: SC) is a county located in the U.S. state of Kansas. As of the 2020 census, the county population was 5,151. Its county seat is Scott City, the only city in the county.

History

Early history

For many millennia, the Great Plains of North America was inhabited by nomadic Native Americans.  From the 16th century to 18th century, the Kingdom of France claimed ownership of large parts of North America.  In 1762, after the French and Indian War, France secretly ceded New France to Spain, per the Treaty of Fontainebleau.

19th century
In 1802, Spain returned most of the land to France, but keeping title to about 7,500 square miles.  In 1803, most of the land for modern day Kansas was acquired by the United States from France as part of the 828,000 square mile Louisiana Purchase for 2.83 cents per acre.

In 1854, the Kansas Territory was organized, then in 1861 Kansas became the 34th U.S. state.  In 1873, Scott County was established.

Geography

Adjacent counties
 Gove County (northeast)
 Lane County (east)
 Finney County (south)
 Kearny County (southwest)
 Wichita County (west)
 Logan County (northwest)

Demographics

As of the census of 2000, there were 5,120 people, 2,045 households, and 1,435 families residing in the county.  The population density was 7 people per square mile (3/km2).  There were 2,291 housing units at an average density of 3 per square mile (1/km2).  The racial makeup of the county was 95.47% White, 0.10% Black or African American, 0.55% Native American, 0.12% Asian, 2.75% from other races, and 1.02% from two or more races.  6.31% of the population were Hispanic or Latino of any race.

There were 2,045 households, out of which 33.30% had children under the age of 18 living with them, 61.00% were married couples living together, 6.70% had a female householder with no husband present, and 29.80% were non-families. 27.30% of all households were made up of individuals, and 13.60% had someone living alone who was 65 years of age or older.  The average household size was 2.46 and the average family size was 3.01.

In the county, the population was spread out, with 27.10% under the age of 18, 6.60% from 18 to 24, 25.30% from 25 to 44, 24.40% from 45 to 64, and 16.50% who were 65 years of age or older.  The median age was 39 years. For every 100 females there were 97.10 males.  For every 100 females age 18 and over, there were 94.40 males.

The median income for a household in the county was $40,534, and the median income for a family was $50,549. Males had a median income of $32,166 versus $20,221 for females. The per capita income for the county was $20,443.  About 2.10% of families and 5.10% of the population were below the poverty line, including 6.00% of those under age 18 and 8.10% of those age 65 or over.

Government

Presidential elections
Prior to 1940, Scott County was a swing county, voting for the national winner in every presidential election from 1904 to 1936. From 1940 on, it has become one of the most Republican counties in the entire nation, with Barry Goldwater in 1964 being the lone Republican candidate since then to be held to single-digit margin of victory in the county. In addition, each of the last six presidential elections have resulted in the Republican candidate winning over 70 percent of the county's vote & the Democratic candidate being held under 20 percent.

Laws
Although the Kansas Constitution was amended in 1986 to allow the sale of alcoholic liquor by the individual drink with the approval of voters, Scott County has remained a prohibition, or "dry", county, with 3.2% cereal-malt beverages available in grocery stores.

Education

Unified school districts
 Scott County USD 466

Library
The Scott County Public Library is located at 110 West 8th in Scott City. The Scott County Library was the first free county public library in the state of Kansas. It was started in September 1923 with the five members of the library committee each checking out a book for herself and one for her husband thus the library checked out ten books on the first day that it was open. Two rooms on the second floor of the Cretcher Lumber Company office building were made available for the library. L. W. Cretcher, owner of the lumber yard, gave the library a boost by painting the rooms, furnishing a stove, shelves, cupboards, lights, and free rent. In November 1924 a proposal was placed on the ballot for the library to be a county funded entity. A room was set aside in the basement of the newly built courthouse for the library, which at that time possessed 861 books. The library in the courthouse was opened to the public in July 1925. The library remained in the basement of the Scott County Courthouse until a separate library building was constructed at 110 West 8th Street in 1964.

Communities

Cities
 Scott City

Unincorporated communities
† means a Census-Designated Place (CDP) by the United States Census Bureau.
 Chevron
 Grigston
 Hutchins
 Manning
 Modoc
 Pence
 Shallow Water†

Townships
Scott County is divided into seven townships.  Scott City is considered governmentally independent and is excluded from the census figures for the townships.  In the following table, the population center is the largest city (or cities) included in that township's population total, if it is of a significant size.

See also
 El Cuartelejo Apache and Puebloan site
 Lake Scott State Park
 Dry counties

References

Notes

Further reading

 Standard Atlas of Scott County, Kansas; Western Publishing Co; 34 pages; 1910.
 Handbook of Scott County, Kansas; C.S. Burch Publishing Co; 20 pages; 1887.

External links

County
 
 Scott County - Directory of Public Officials
Other
 Scott County Library
Maps
 Scott County Maps: Current, Historic, KDOT
 Kansas Highway Maps: Current, Historic, KDOT
 Kansas Railroad Maps: Current, 1996, 1915, KDOT and Kansas Historical Society

 
Kansas counties
1873 establishments in Kansas
Populated places established in 1873